Van Belleghem is a surname. Notable people with the surname include:

Joseph Van Belleghem (1901–1967), Canadian politician
Wim Van Belleghem (born 1963), Belgian rower

Dutch-language surnames
Surnames of Belgian origin